Sherwood High School is a secondary school in Sandy Spring in unincorporated Montgomery County, Maryland, United States. Sherwood's program of interest is the international studies program, and it is also known for its music and athletic programs.  Sherwood draws students from Farquhar and Rosa Parks Middle Schools.

Sherwood serves the areas of Olney, Ashton, and Brookeville.

History
Sherwood Academy was built on a piece of land donated in 1883, that was once part of Sherwood Farm – named because the abundance of trees was reminiscent of Robin Hood's Sherwood Forest.  In 1906, Sherwood became the third public high school in Montgomery County, after Richard Montgomery High School and Gaithersburg High School. The original school building was replaced in 1950, and the 1,000-seat Ertzman theatre was added in 1974. The school was renovated in 1989-1991, during which students were temporarily moved to the Northwood High School building in Silver Spring. During the summer of 2007, a new wing was added to the school, creating new classrooms for science and English.

Student body
Sherwood High School had 1,922 students enrolled for the 2016-2017 school year. The school's student body was 50% non-Hispanic Caucasian, 17% African American, 11% Asian, and 18% Hispanic. The graduation rate for the school was 93.6%, with 79.3% planning to go on to college.  In SAT testing, students had an average score of 553 (math), 532 (verbal), and 1085 (total), which placed Sherwood under the Montgomery County average of 1102 (total), but above the national average of 1028 (total). Approximately 65% of the students took an AP exam during the 2010-2011 school year, and about 74% of them passed.

Academics
The International Studies Program distinguishes the school by providing a uniquely focused program. The program was established in 1998, coinciding with broader restructuring that occurred with the opening of the nearby James Hubert Blake High School. Blake High School, along with Paint Branch High School and Springbrook High School, formed the Northeast Consortium of schools. The consortium provides each with a uniquely specialized program which students can opt for instead of attending their local school. While Sherwood is not a member of the consortium, it established the International Studies Program. Sherwood is a member of the International Studies Schools Association, a national network of schools dedicated to improving students' understanding of the world.

In 2006, Sherwood High School was listed in Newsweeks top 1200 American High Schools, as the 388th highest-rated school in the country, up 61 places from its 2005 ranking of 449.

In 2008 the Leaves yearbook theme was "What Does It Take To Be a Warrior?"

A new system of academies was implemented beginning with the class of 2013. Students choose from four academies: Business and Hospitality; Engineering and Technology; Science; and Arts and Humanities. The academies allow students to specialize in their area of interest.

Music
Sherwood High School has music programs, including the annual Rock 'n Roll Revival show, which was established in 1971. The original concept for the show was conceived by a group of Sherwood students who were inspired after seeing a concert at Madison Square Garden in October 1971. Faculty members also appeared in the first show in 1972.  The show includes the performance of a mix of songs from the late 1950s to the late 1990s. Each March, Rock 'n' Roll Revival has performances over two weekends at Ertzman Theatre, with a seventh performance for students in area middle and elementary schools.

Sherwood High School also has an Instrumental Music Department and offers jazz band, jazz lab, concert band, and symphonic orchestra. Also offered are choruses including jazz choir, show choir, and a women's chorus.

Athletics
The Sherwood Warriors have won Maryland state championships in the following sports:

 Baseball: 2008, 2010, 2021, 2022
 First repeat state baseball champion in class 4A (or equivalent) since 1982
 Basketball (boys): 1979, 2007 
 Basketball (girls): 1974, 1976
 Cross Country (boys): 1979, 2003
 Field Hockey: 1980, 1985
 Football: 1995, 1996, 2008 
 Golf: 1980, 1994
 Soccer (boys): 1977, 1985, 1986, 1988, 2004, 2005 
 Softball: 2012, 2013, 2014, 2015, 2016, 2019, 2022
 105 consecutive games won from 2012-2017, Maryland state record 
 Swimming: 2016, 2018, 2019
 Volleyball: 2006, 2010, 2011, 2012
 Wrestling: 1997

Individual championships:

 During the 2008 cross country season, Solomon Haile went undefeated en route the 4A Maryland State individual title and the Footlocker Cross Country Championship individual title.

Notable alumni
 Richie Anderson, National Football League (NFL) fullback
 Ray Goodlett, pastor and former professional soccer player
 Justin Maxwell, Major League Baseball player
 Allison Miller, musician
 Oguchi Onyewu, soccer player
 Scott Van Pelt, ESPN anchor
 Sean Whalen, actor
 Katie Feeney, Social Media Personality

References

External links
 Sherwood High School website

Public high schools in Montgomery County, Maryland
Educational institutions established in 1906
1906 establishments in Maryland